Layer or layered may refer to:

Arts, entertainment, and media
Layers (Kungs album)
Layers (Les McCann album)
Layers (Royce da 5'9" album)
"Layers", the title track of Royce da 5'9"'s sixth studio album
Layer, a female Maverick Hunter in the Mega Man X series
Layer, an element in a digital painting
Layer (film), a 2022 Russian film

Science
 Stratum, a layer of rock or soil with internally consistent characteristics
 Thermocline, a layer within a body of water where the temperature changes rapidly with depth
Layer, an area in the neocortex with specific structure and connection pattern among neurons

Technology

Computing
 Layer (object-oriented design), a group of classes that have the same set of link-time module dependencies to other modules
 Layers (digital image editing), used in digital image editing to separate different elements of an image
 Layers, in 2D computer graphics
 Abstraction layer, a way of hiding the implementation details of a particular set of functionality
 Internet protocol suite layers
 OSI model layers
 Layer element, a deprecated <iframe>-like tag, unique to Netscape 4 browsers
 Layer of objects, a term in CAD
 Map layer, a set of graphical information, especially in geographic information systems
 Layer (deep learning), a structure in the architecture of a deep learning model, which take information from the previous layers and then pass information to the next layer

Electronics
 Layer (electronics), a single thickness of some material covering a surface
 Dual layer recording, a DVD layer
 F region, or Appleton Layer in telecommunications

Other uses
 Layer, a tier of archaeological deposits in an excavation
 Layer hen, a hen raised to produce eggs
 Layer cake, a cake consisting of stacked layers
 Layered, Inc., an American software company 
 Layered clothing, the wearing of multiple layers of clothing for practical or fashion purposes
 Layered hair, a popular hair-styling technique
 Walter Francis Layer (1907-1965), American politician and U.S. Marine Corps colonel

See also
 Layering (disambiguation)
 Multilevel (disambiguation)